, also known as Spy Hunter, is a 1965 film directed by Masahiro Shinoda, based on a novel by Koji Nakada.  The legendary ninja Sasuke Sarutobi tracks the spy Nojiri, while a mysterious figure named Sakon leads a band of men on their own quest for the wily Nojiri. Soon no one knows just who is who and what side anyone is on.  Made during the height of the cold war, the film follows the lives of spies caught up in the power struggles of their times.

Plot 
It is set in the period between the Battle of Sekigahara in 1600 and the Siege of Osaka in 1614. Years of warfare end in a Japan unified under the Tokugawa shogunate, but the peace is threatened.  It follows Sarutobi Sasuke (Kōji Takahashi), a spy for the Sanada Clan.  Sasuke, tired of conflict, longs for peace. When a high-ranking spy named Tatewaki Koriyama defects from the shogun to a rival clan, Sasuke is caught between two rival groups of spies, those working for the Tokugawa Shogunate and those supporting the Toyotomi Clan. Tokugawa Ieyasu's clan was in the strategically superior position after having won the Battle of Sekigahara but had engendered much hatred among samurai who had become rōnin after the Battle.

The Tokugawa spies are led by Sakon Takatani (Tetsurō Tamba) and Tatewaki Koriyama (Eiji Okada) and the Toyotomi by Shigeyuki Koremura (Eitaro Ozawa) and his lieutenant Takanosuke Nojiri (Kei Satō). The story begins when Sasuke is approached by another Toyotomi spy Mitsuaki Inamura (Mutsuhiro Toura), who tells Sasuke that Tatewaki means to betray Tokugawa and join the Toyotomi. Sasuke, believing that this intrigue will start another war, tells Mitsuaki that he wants no part in it, but Mitsuaki begs Sasuke to help him since the local magistrate Genba Kuni (Minoru Hodaka) is on the lookout for him. Mitsuaki goes into the town with him and they see Genba Kuni cruelly parading a young man who is a Christian that he has captured and Mitsuaki admits to betraying the Christian in order to distract Kuni and allow him to get through his district.

As they are on the road Sasuke notices a beautiful women with an older man who they had seen in town but Mitsuaki is attacked outside of town and Sasuke comes to his rescue, but later at an inn in the next town, Mitsuaki is assassinated. Sasuke finds him dead and is chased as the murderer since he comes out of the room. He escapes but soon meets the beautiful woman who entices him to come to her room, and when she turns up dead Sasuke is suspected. Sasuke decides he must find the true killer or killers and at the same time finds himself involved in the intrigue which he sought to avoid to find Tatewaki and help him to betray Tokugawa and join the Toyotomi.

Cast
Sasuke Sarutobi - spy Koji Takahashi 
Saizo Kirigakure - spy Shintaro Ishihara
Shigeyuki Koremura - leader of spies Eitaro Ozawa 
Takanosuke Nojiri - lieutenant Kei Satō 
Mitsuaki Inamura - spy Mutsuhiro Toura 
Sakon Takatani - lieutenant Tetsurō Tamba
Tatewaki Koriyama - lieutenant Eiiji Okada 
Jinnai–Kazutaka Horikawa - clan minister Seiji Miyaguchi
Genba Kuni - magistrate Minoru Hodaka 
Okiwa - dancer and spy Misako Watanabe
Yashiro Kobayashi - Christian samurai Yasunori Irikawa 
Omiyo - orphan in Joshinji Temple Jitsuko Yoshimura 
Joshinji - Temple priest Jun Hamamura

References

External links

Samurai Spy - Vintage Ninja
Samurai Spy (1965) - gotterdammerung.org
Wild Realm Reviews: Samurai Spy
Samurai Spy: The Thin Line Between Truth and Lies an essay by Alain Silver at the Criterion Collection

1965 films
Films based on romance novels
Films based on Japanese novels
Films directed by Masahiro Shinoda
1960s Japanese-language films
Jidaigeki films
Ninja films
1965 romantic drama films
Samurai films
1960s Japanese films